Rod Glenn is an English actor and author from northeast England.

He trained in Theatre and Performing Arts at North Tyneside College and has gone on to appear in many film and television productions, including Monster, Ripper Street, The More You Ignore Me, American Assassin, The Hollow Crown, Wolfblood and The Hippopotamus. His performance in Monster was described as 'one hell of a performance' and a 'revelation' by Ginger Nuts of Horror. Machine Mean described him as 'Glenn brought an incredibly unique intensity to this, clearly putting all into this role.'

He achieved critical and commercial success with Sinema: The Northumberland Massacre released in 2007 (Wasteland Press) and again in 2010 (Wild Wolf Publishing). A contemporary thriller set in the north east of England about a film-obsessed serial killer stalking a remote Northumberland community.  Friday the 13th star and horror icon Adrienne King described it as "Masterful writing" and The Crack Magazine described it as "One of the most heart racing, jaw-dropping novels that I have ever dared to finish."

Writing Biography 
The King of America (2006) 
Sinema: The Northumberland Massacre (2007) 
Radgepacket: Tales From The Inner Cities (2008) (Contributor) 
The King of America: Epic Edition (2009) 
The Killing Moon (2009) 
P.O.W. Wartime Log of F/Sgt T D Glenn (2010) (Contributor) 
Holiday of the Dead (2011) (Contributor) 
Sinema 2: Sympathy for the Devil (2011) 
Sinema 3: The Troy Consortium (2013) 
Wild Wolf's Twisted Tails (2014) (Contributor) 
Slaughterville (2017)

Acting filmography 
Michael Rice (singer) 'Bigger Than Us' Eurovision Song Contest Music Video (2019) : 'Nasty' DadMonster (2018) : RichardAmerican Assassin (2017) : Orion InstructorThe More You Ignore Me (2017) : Ambulance DriverJudge Rinder's Crime Stories (2017) : Mark StephensGuest in London (2017) : Police SergeantWolfblood (2016) : Wild Wolfblood WarriorThe Hippopotamus (2016) : BassianusGod's Kingdom (2016) : RobinOutside (2016) : Robert Falcon ScottBliss! (2015) : DadWhiteblade (2015) : AethelfrithSweet Pea (2015) : Donald (lead)Becoming Freddie (2015) : Character 1 The Exorcist Chronicles (2015) : Lance Corporal Spader The Sceptic (2015) : Dr Jan Lucane The Dark Ages (2015) : The Hitman & StuntsThe Hollow Crown (2014) : Lord Stanley's Bodyguard & Fight CrewThe Fairy Flag (2014) : Insubordinate Soldier & Fight CrewDolls (2014) : DCI Jimmy ParkinsUnbeaten (2014) : Fighter 1Ripper Street (2014) : Train RobberToo Young to Die (2014) : School TeacherWho Done What (2014) : Detective Inspector GalbraithChildren of the World's End (2014) : Radio DJ Bill (2014) : Builder Macbeth (2014) : Macbeth Soldier & Fight CrewWhite Lies (2014) : Detective Briggs Fury (2013) : World War II American Soldier The Monuments Men (2013) : World War II British SoldierShortcut to Hell (2013) : Thomas Run (2012) : PaulBroken England (2012) : Rob England The Bad Samaritan Must Die (2012) : Lead Bodyguard World War Z'' (2011) : Riot Police Officer

External links 
 Rod Glenn's official website
 Rod Glenn's Spotlight page
 Rod Glenn's Equity page
 Rod Glenn's Agent
 The Journal interview with Rod Glenn
 
 Press article on Rod's role in Monster
 Film review of Monster

English writers
21st-century English male actors
Living people
Year of birth missing (living people)
English male film actors
English male television actors